Glycobiology is a monthly peer-reviewed scientific journal covering all aspects of the field of glycobiology and the official journal of the Society for Glycobiology. It is published by Oxford University Press. The journal was established in September 1990. It publishes primary research on the "biological functions of glycans, including glycoproteins, glycolipids, proteoglycans and free oligosaccharides, and on proteins that specifically interact with glycans."

Abstracting and indexing
The journal is indexed in Index Medicus/PubMed/MEDLINE, Index Veterinarius, CAB Abstracts, Biological Abstracts, BIOSIS Previews, Current Contents/Life Sciences, ProQuest, Science Citation Index, and others. According to the Journal Citation Reports, its 2019 impact factor is 4.060, ranking it 102nd out of 297 journals in the category "Biochemistry & Molecular Biology".

References

External links

Biochemistry journals
English-language journals
Glycobiology
Publications established in 1990
Monthly journals
Oxford University Press academic journals
Academic journals associated with learned and professional societies